Macau elects at the regional level its head of government and legislature. The Legislative Assembly is made up of 33 members, of whom 14 are elected by popular vote under proportional representation, 12 elected from functional constituencies and 7 appointed by the Chief Executive. The Chief Executive of Macau is returned by a 400-member Election Committee on five-year intervals.

Voter registration and candidacy
Natural persons can register as an elector of direct suffrage to the Legislative Assembly if they:
 have reached 18 years of age;
 are permanent resident of Macau; and
 are not declared by Courts as incompetent persons, deprived of political rights or manifestly insane.

Legal persons can nominate at most 22 electors with natural person suffrage to exercise the collective’s voting rights for indirect suffrage to the Legislative Assembly and the Election Committee if they:
 are confirmed to be operating within the specified sector for at least 4 years;
 have obtained legal personality for at least 7 years; and
 for the Election Committee elections, are not in office as the Chief Executive, Principal Officials, Judicial Magistrates, Public Ministers and Members of the Election Management Committee.

Natural persons registered as electors can run for elections of direct suffrage and indirect suffrage in the sector they belong to. Electors can also run for the Election Committee if they are not in office as the Chief Executive, Principal Officials, Judicial Magistrates, Public Ministers and Members of the Election Management Committee.

Legislative Assembly elections
Elections were held to return members of the Legislative Assembly since 1976. Members returned from direct suffrage and indirect suffrage have been elected under proportional representation with seats apportioned under the highest averages method using the D'Hondt method. Suffrage was opened to Macau Residents without Portuguese citizenship in 1984.

Compositions of elected seats in the Legislative Assembly are as follows:

1992

1996

2001

2005

2009

2013

2017

2021

Chief Executive elections
Candidates of the Chief Executive are required to be nominated by at least 50 members of the Election Committee, before he is returned by the Election Committee with an absolute majority. The compositions of electoral colleges returning the Chief Executive are as follows:

1999

2004

2009

2014

2019

See also
 Electoral calendar
 Electoral system

Notes

References

External links
 Chief Executive Election Law (English translation)
 Chief Executive Election Law (Portuguese version)
 Chief Executive Election Law (Chinese version)

 
Politics of Macau